Hurriyya Sports Club is a Maldivian sports club best known for its football team. They competed in top level Dhivehi League from 1996 and were relegated to second division in 2006.

Achievements
Dhivehi League: 1
 2005
POMIS Cup: 2
 1999, 2000

Performance in AFC competitions
Asian Club Championship: 1 appearance
2001: Second Round

AFC Cup: 1 appearance
2006: Group Stage

Current squad

External links
 Official Website

Football clubs in the Maldives
Football clubs in Malé
Association football clubs established in 1988
1988 establishments in the Maldives